Spotswood (1:31, also known as The Efficiency Expert 1:29, in the United States) is a 1991 Australian business comedy-drama film directed by Mark Joffe. The film stars Anthony Hopkins, with a supporting cast of Ben Mendelsohn, Alwyn Kurts, Bruno Lawrence, Angela Punch McGregor, Daniel Wyllie,Toni Collette (in film debut) and Russell Crowe.

Plot
In late 1960s Melbourne, Errol Wallace (Anthony Hopkins) is a financial business consultant whom we meet in the course of his being hired by the board of Durmack, an automotive component manufacturer, where he assesses a large work force redundancy and recommends major layoffs.

Balls, a moccasin factory located in the Melbourne suburb of Spotswood, is his next client. Mr. Ball (Alwyn Kurts), the owner of the company, is affable and treats his employees benevolently. Wallace on a factory tour finds the conditions wanting with shabbiness, old machinery and the workers lackadaisical.

A young worker at Balls, Carey (Ben Mendelsohn), who is finding his place in the world and life, is asked by Wallace to assist in his review, compiling worker condition and performance information. Carey is reluctant until he learns that Mr. Ball's daughter Cheryl (Rebecca Rigg), whom he fancies, is part of the review staff.

Wallace learns that there is an instigator in the midst, his colleague Jerry (John Walton), who leaks the Durmack report, inflating the quantity of sackings as a means to demoralise the union.

Kim Barry (Russell Crowe), a salesman at Balls who also has his sights set on the boss's daughter, shows his ruthlessness and ulterior motives when he comes to Wallace's home one night with a complete set of the company financial records that detail non-existent profit for years and reveal that Ball has been selling off company assets to keep the outfit afloat.

Wallace realises that whatever productivity improvements have been implemented are not enough to save the company even with an elimination of workers and yet that is his recommendation. Mr. Ball responds, "It’s not just about dollars and cents. It’s about dignity, treating people with respect".

Wallace's mind set starts to change when his car is vandalised and some Ball workers come to his aid, workers who then start to include him in their off-hours activities. Mr. Ball announces the work force redundancies and Wallace is clearly uncomfortable seeing them, knowing that it was his recommendation that sealed their fate.

The union at Durmack capitulates and management celebrates with a party during  which Wallace becomes further disenchanted by what he sees as the rash sackings. He then realizes that Balls may have a competitive advantage that could potentially make the company profitable. If Balls stop trying to compete on price on a few products, but instead have a very large product range, then all the perceived inefficiencies (old machinery, and a large number of highly skilled experienced workers), become opportunities for growth.

Carey realises he has feelings for his work mate and friend Wendy (Toni Collette) and together they climb up onto the roof of the factory and hold hands as they look out over Spotswood.

Cast
 Anthony Hopkins as Errol Wallace
 Ben Mendelsohn as Carey
 Alwyn Kurts as Mr. Ball
 Bruno Lawrence as Robert, Carey's Father
 John Walton as Jerry Finn
 Rebecca Rigg as Cheryl Ball
 Toni Collette as Wendy Robinson
 Russell Crowe as Kim Barry
 Angela Punch McGregor as Caroline Wallace
 Daniel Wyllie as Frank Fletcher
 John Flaus as Gordon
 Gary Adams as Kevin
 Jeff Truman as Ron
 Toni Lamond as Mrs. Lorna Ball
 Jill Murray (credited as Jillian Murray) as Ophelia, Carey's Mum
Lesley Baker (credited as Leslie Baker) as Gwen, Carey's aunt
  Russell James Fairweather  as Opposition Driver "JACK" Don Small Goods.

Box office
Spotswood grossed $1,505,884 at the box office in Australia, which is equivalent to $2,348,887 in 2009 dollars.

See also
 Cinema of Australia
 Russell Crowe filmography

References

External links
 
 
 
 Spotswood at the National Film and Sound Archive
Spotswood at Oz Movies

1991 films
1991 comedy-drama films
1991 independent films
1990s business films
Australian comedy-drama films
Australian independent films
Films about businesspeople
Films directed by Mark Joffe
Films set in the 1960s
Films shot in Melbourne
1990s English-language films